Pentyl hexanoate (C5H11COO.C5H11) is an ester found in apple and pineapple fruits. It is closely related to pentyl butyrate and pentyl pentanoate, both of which are also present in fruits.

References

External links
PubChem

Caproate esters